The champion jockey of flat racing in Great Britain is the rider who has the most wins during a season. For most of its existence, the jockeys championship was decided on the number of winners ridden between Lincoln Handicap Day and November Handicap Day, the traditional flat turf season. In 2015, it was announced that the title would be decided over a reduced timescale – the start of the Guineas Meeting and British Champions Day, roughly 24 instead of 32 weeks.

A prize of £25,000 to the champion jockey and £10,000 to the runner up was also introduced as part of the 2015 changes.

The championship was sponsored for the first time in 2009 by online casino 32Red and is currently sponsored by Stobart Group.

Champions
The list below shows the champion jockey and the number of winners for each year since 1840.  The seasonal record of jockeys' winners was published for the first time in 1846.

Jockeys are of British nationality unless stated

 1840 - Nat Flatman - 50
 1841 - Nat Flatman - 68
 1842 - Nat Flatman - 42
 1843 - Nat Flatman - 60
 1844 - Nat Flatman - 64
 1845 - Nat Flatman - 81
 1846 - Nat Flatman - 81
 1847 - Nat Flatman - 89
 1848 - Nat Flatman - 104
 1849 - Nat Flatman - 94
 1850 - Nat Flatman - 88
 1851 - Nat Flatman - 78
 1852 - Nat Flatman - 92
 1853 - John Wells - 86
 1854 - John Wells - 82
 1855 - George Fordham - 70
 1856 - George Fordham - 108
 1857 - George Fordham - 84
 1858 - George Fordham - 91
 1859 - George Fordham - 118
 1860 - George Fordham - 146
 1861 - George Fordham - 106
 1862 - George Fordham - 166
 1863 - George Fordham - 103
 1864 - Jemmy Grimshaw - 164
 1865 - George Fordham - 142
 1866 - Sam Kenyon - 123
 1867 - George Fordham - 143
 1868 - George Fordham - 110
 1869 - George Fordham - 95
 1870 - William Gray / Charlie Maidment - 76
 1871 - George Fordham / Charlie Maidment - 86
 1872 - Tom Cannon, Sr. - 87
 1873 - Harry Constable - 110
 1874 - Fred Archer - 147
 1875 - Fred Archer - 172
 1876 - Fred Archer - 207
 1877 - Fred Archer - 218
 1878 - Fred Archer - 229
 1879 - Fred Archer - 197
 1880 - Fred Archer - 120
 1881 - Fred Archer - 220
 1882 - Fred Archer - 210
 1883 - Fred Archer - 232
 1884 - Fred Archer - 241
 1885 - Fred Archer - 246
 1886 - Fred Archer - 170
 1887 - Charles Wood - 151
 1888 - Fred Barrett - 108
 1889 - Tommy Loates - 167
 1890 - Tommy Loates - 147
 1891 - Morny Cannon - 137
 1892 - Morny Cannon - 182
 1893 - Tommy Loates - 222
 1894 - Morny Cannon - 167
 1895 - Morny Cannon - 184
 1896 - Morny Cannon - 164
 1897 - Morny Cannon - 145
 1898 - Otto Madden - 161
 1899 - Sam Loates - 160
 1900 -  Lester Reiff - 143
 1901 - Otto Madden - 130
 1902 - Willie Lane - 170
 1903 - Otto Madden - 154
 1904 - Otto Madden - 161
 1905 - Elijah Wheatley - 124
 1906 - William Higgs - 149
 1907 - William Higgs - 146
 1908 -  Danny Maher - 139
 1909 -  Frank Wootton - 165
 1910 -  Frank Wootton - 137
 1911 -  Frank Wootton - 187
 1912 -  Frank Wootton - 118
 1913 -  Danny Maher - 115
 1914 - Steve Donoghue - 129
 1915 - Steve Donoghue - 62
 1916 - Steve Donoghue - 43
 1917 - Steve Donoghue - 42
 1918 - Steve Donoghue - 66
 1919 - Steve Donoghue - 129
 1920 - Steve Donoghue - 143
 1921 - Steve Donoghue - 141
 1922 - Steve Donoghue - 102
 1923 - Steve Donoghue / Charlie Elliott - 89
 1924 - Charlie Elliott - 106
 1925 - Gordon Richards - 118
 1926 - Tommy Weston - 95
 1927 - Gordon Richards - 164
 1928 - Gordon Richards - 148
 1929 - Gordon Richards - 135
 1930 - Freddie Fox - 129
 1931 - Gordon Richards - 145
 1932 - Gordon Richards - 190
 1933 - Gordon Richards - 259
 1934 - Gordon Richards - 212
 1935 - Gordon Richards - 217
 1936 - Gordon Richards - 174
 1937 - Gordon Richards - 216
 1938 - Gordon Richards - 206
 1939 - Gordon Richards - 155
 1940 - Gordon Richards - 68
 1941 - Harry Wragg - 71
 1942 - Gordon Richards - 67
 1943 - Gordon Richards - 65
 1944 - Gordon Richards - 88
 1945 - Gordon Richards - 104
 1946 - Gordon Richards - 212
 1947 - Gordon Richards - 269
 1948 - Gordon Richards - 224
 1949 - Gordon Richards - 261
 1950 - Gordon Richards - 201
 1951 - Gordon Richards - 227
 1952 - Gordon Richards - 231
 1953 - Gordon Richards - 191
 1954 - Doug Smith - 129
 1955 - Doug Smith - 168
 1956 - Doug Smith - 155
 1957 -  Scobie Breasley - 173
 1958 - Doug Smith - 165
 1959 - Doug Smith - 157
 1960 - Lester Piggott - 170
 1961 -  Scobie Breasley - 171
 1962 -  Scobie Breasley - 179
 1963 -  Scobie Breasley - 176
 1964 - Lester Piggott - 140
 1965 - Lester Piggott - 160
 1966 - Lester Piggott - 191
 1967 - Lester Piggott - 117
 1968 - Lester Piggott - 139
 1969 - Lester Piggott - 163
 1970 - Lester Piggott - 162
 1971 - Lester Piggott - 162
 1972 - Willie Carson - 132
 1973 - Willie Carson - 164
 1974 - Pat Eddery - 148
 1975 - Pat Eddery - 164
 1976 - Pat Eddery - 162
 1977 - Pat Eddery - 176
 1978 - Willie Carson - 182
 1979 - Joe Mercer - 164
 1980 - Willie Carson - 166
 1981 - Lester Piggott - 179
 1982 - Lester Piggott - 188
 1983 - Willie Carson - 159
 1984 -  Steve Cauthen - 130
 1985 -  Steve Cauthen - 195
 1986 -  Pat Eddery - 176
 1987 -  Steve Cauthen - 197
 1988 -  Pat Eddery - 183
 1989 -  Pat Eddery - 171
 1990 -  Pat Eddery - 209
 1991 -  Pat Eddery - 165
 1992 -  Michael Roberts - 206
 1993 -  Pat Eddery - 169
 1994 -  Frankie Dettori - 233
 1995 -  Frankie Dettori - 211
 1996 -  Pat Eddery - 186
 1997 -  Kieren Fallon - 202
 1998 -  Kieren Fallon - 204
 1999 -  Kieren Fallon - 200
 2000 - Kevin Darley - 155
 2001 -  Kieren Fallon - 166
 2002 -  Kieren Fallon - 136
 2003 -  Kieren Fallon - 207
 2004 -  Frankie Dettori - 192
 2005 -  Jamie Spencer - 163
 2006 - Ryan Moore - 180
 2007 - Seb Sanders / Jamie Spencer - 190
 2008 - Ryan Moore - 186
 2009 - Ryan Moore - 174
 2010 - Paul Hanagan - 191
 2011 - Paul Hanagan - 165
 2012 -  Richard Hughes - 172
 2013 -  Richard Hughes - 208
 2014 -  Richard Hughes - 161
 2015 -  Silvestre de Sousa - 132
 2016 - Jim Crowley - 148
 2017 -  Silvestre de Sousa -155
 2018 -  Silvestre de Sousa - 148
 2019 -  Oisin Murphy - 168
 2020 -  Oisin Murphy - 142
 2021 -  Oisin Murphy - 153
 2022 - William Buick - 157

Records
Most titles - 26, Gordon Richards
Most consecutive titles - 13, Nat Flatman (1840-1852), Fred Archer (1874-1886)
Most wins in a season - 269, Gordon Richards (1947)

See also
 British flat racing Champion Apprentice
 British flat racing Champion Trainer
 British flat racing Champion Owner
 British jump racing Champion Jockey
 Leading sire in Great Britain & Ireland

References

Bibliography

British jockeys
Horse racing in Great Britain
British Champion jockeys
 
Champion jockeys